The 1955 Milan–San Remo was the 46th edition of the Milan–San Remo cycle race and was held on 19 March 1955. The race started in Milan and finished in San Remo. The race was won by Germain Derycke of the Alcyon team.

General classification

References

1955
1955 in road cycling
1955 in Italian sport
1955 Challenge Desgrange-Colombo
March 1955 sports events in Europe